"Umma Do Me" is the debut single by American hip hop recording artist Rocko. It was released on October 23, 2007 on Rocko's Rocky Road imprint through So So Def Recordings and Island Records, from his debut album Self-Made. The song was produced by Drumma Boy.

In the United States, "Umma Do Me" peaked at number 15 on Billboards Hot R&B/Hip-Hop Songs chart, and number 66 on the Billboard Hot 100.

Music video
Jermaine Dupri, Shawty Lo, Future, The-Dream and Trae make cameo appearances in the video. The video peaked at number 2 on BET's 106 & Park.

Remixes/freestyles
The official remix features Rick Ross, T.I. and Young Jeezy.
 "Do U Potna"- T.I., Young Jeezy and Big Kuntry King
 "Imma True G"- freestyle by Cassidy 
 "I Do Me"- freestyle by Dolla
 "Umma Do Me"- freestyle by B.G.(rapper)

Charts

Weekly charts

Year-end charts

References

2007 songs
2007 debut singles
Rocko (rapper) songs
Song recordings produced by Drumma Boy
Songs written by Drumma Boy